John Sangster Macfarlane (1818 – 2 February 1880) was a 19th-century Member of Parliament in Auckland, New Zealand.

He then represented the Waitemata electorate from 1876 to 1879, when he was defeated.

He was born in Haddington, East Lothian, Scotland and arrived in Auckland via Sydney. He died in Auckland on 2 February 1880 from cancer of the stomach.

Two or three years before his death he lost a bet that a "prominent politician" would soon be in Mt Eden (gaol) and Swanson kept and showed but did not cash the cheque for £80 he received from Macfarlane.

References

1818 births
1880 deaths
19th-century New Zealand politicians
Members of the New Zealand House of Representatives
New Zealand MPs for Auckland electorates
People from Haddington, East Lothian
Unsuccessful candidates in the 1879 New Zealand general election